Madigan is an American crime drama television series based on the 1968 film of the same title, starring Richard Widmark as Sgt. Dan Madigan. The show aired on NBC in 1972-73 as part of the NBC Mystery Movie umbrella series.

Synopsis
Dan Madigan is a veteran police officer in New York, now dedicated to investigating cases in Europe. He is incorruptible and organized crime is the target. Despite the fact that the character in the 1968 film version died he was resurrected for this 'Mystery Movie' version which depicted the seedier side of New York for the initial home based episode, the short run series duly moved the central character to various overseas locations for episodes such as; 'The Lisbon Beat', 'The London Beat' etc.
The show was initially grouped alongside; Banacek (George Peppard) and Cool Million (James Farentino) as part of a rotating wheel of 'Mystery Movies' but never returned for a second season  (along with 'Cool Million') while 'Banacek' was later grouped with Faraday & Company, Tenafly and The Snoop Sisters for its second season. The character was based on a much less admirable policeman in Richard Dougherty's 1962 novel "The Commissioner."

Episodes

References
 Late Show - Writings  on Film, by Brian W. Fairbanks
 television by Douglas Snauffer

External links
 
 Madigan at The Classic TV Archive

1972 American television series debuts
1973 American television series endings
1970s American crime drama television series
American detective television series
English-language television shows
NBC Mystery Movie
NBC original programming
Live action television shows based on films
Television series by Universal Television
Television shows set in New York City